The 1956 Cal Poly Mustangs football team represented California Polytechnic State College—now known as California Polytechnic State University, San Luis Obispo—as a member of the California Collegiate Athletic Association (CCAA) during the 1956 NCAA College Division football season. Led by seventh-year head coach LeRoy Hughes, Cal Poly compiled an overall record of 7–3 with a mark of 0–2 in conference play, placing last out of five teams in the CCAA. The team outscored its opponents 270 to 116 for the season. The Mustangs played home games at Mustang Stadium in San Luis Obispo, California.

Schedule

Notes

References

Cal Poly
Cal Poly Mustangs football seasons
Cal Poly Mustangs football